SAG, SAg, or sag may refer to:

Land formations 
 Sag (geology), or trough, a depressed, persistent, low area
 Sag pond, a body of water collected in the lowest parts of a depression

People 
 Ivan Sag (1949–2013), American linguist

Places 
 Šag, a village near Osijek in Croatia
 Sâg, a commune located in Sălaj County, Romania
 Șag, a commune in Timiș County, Romania
 Sag Harbor, New York, a village in Suffolk County, New York, USA
 The Sag, a colloquialism for the Sagtikos State Parkway on Long Island, New York

Science 
 Short for Sagittarius, a zodiac sign 
 SAg, short for superantigen
 SAG (gene), encodes the protein S-Arrestin in humans
 Sagitta (optics), a measure of lens surface shape
 Smoothened agonist, a small bioactive molecule
 Lens sag, distortion of astronomical lenses and mirrors
 Voltage sag or voltage dip, brief drop in voltage
 SAG or single amplified genome, used to describe genomes recovered from a single cell

Organizations
 SAG-AFTRA (Screen Actors Guild‐American Federation of Television and Radio Artists), an American labor union 
 Scientific Analysis Group, a laboratory of the Defence Research and Development Organization of India
 Screen Actors Guild, an American labor union
 SQL Access Group, was a group of software companies
 Surface Action Group, a group of combat ships
 Senior Advisory Group, advisory group to Australian government on the Indigenous voice to government

Other uses
 SG&A, an alternative representation of Selling, General and Administrative Expenses
 SAG mill, semi-autogenous grinding mill
 SAG wagon or broom wagon, a support vehicle following a group of cyclists or people who ride bikes 
 Sango language of Central African Republic (or Sangho'), ISO 639-2 and -3 code
 Screen Actors Guild Awards (also known as the SAG Awards)

See also 
 Saag, a South Asian vegetable dish
Sagging (disambiguation)